The 2008 Welsh local elections took place on 1 May 2008 to elect members of all twenty-two local authorities in Wales. They were held alongside other local elections in the United Kingdom. The previous elections were held in 2004.

Results

Councils

In all 22 Welsh councils the whole of the council was up for election.

Notes

References

External links

 
Welsh local elections
Local elections
Welsh local elections
Welsh local elections by year
Council elections in the United Kingdom
Welsh local elections